Leucosis is a leukemia-like malignant viral disease that is found in animals, particularly poultry and cattle.

Types of leucosis
 Bovine leucosis
 Enzootic bovine leucosis, caused by bovine leukemia virus.
 Sporadic bovine leucosis 
 Calf lymphosarcoma
 Leucosis in pig
 Leucosis in horses
 Leucosis in sheep 
 Feline leucosis
 Feline leukemia virus
 Avian leucosis and related diseases
 Avian sarcoma leukosis virus
 Lymphoid leucosis
 Erythroblastosis
 Osteopetrosis
 Myeloblastose
 Myelocytomatosis

References

Animal diseases
Animal viral diseases